Walter Ayala Gonzales (born 20 July 1971) is a Peruvian judge and former Minister of Defense of Peru.

Career
Ayala was born in Lima. He studied at the Inca Garcilaso de la Vega University where he obtained a master's degree, and at the Federico Villarreal University, where he obtained a master's degree in Civil and Commercial Law, as well as studies in Public Administration and Management with a mention in National Defense.

Ayala worked in the judiciary until 2017 and was also chairman of the ethics committee of the Bar Association of Lima before he was removed from office in 2019.

Defense Minister
On 29 July 2021, Ayala was appointed Minister of Defense of Peru in the Pedro Castillo government.

References

Living people
1971 births
People from Lima
21st-century Peruvian judges
Inca Garcilaso de la Vega University alumni
Federico Villarreal National University alumni
Defense ministers of Peru
21st-century Peruvian politicians